Martha Gibson is a Canadian actress. She is best known for appearing alongside her husband Louis Del Grande in the television series Seeing Things, for which she earned a Gemini Award for Best Actress in a Comedy Series at the 1st Gemini Awards in 1986.

She was nominated in the same category for the same show at the 2nd Gemini Awards in 1987, but lost to Dinah Christie.

At the 4th Gemini Awards in 1989, she won the award for Best Supporting Actress in a Drama Program or Series, for her performance in the television film Two Men.

Gibson also appeared in other notable roles in Black Christmas (1974), Outrageous! (1977) and Murder by Phone (1982), and television series such as King of Kensington, Katts and Dog and Sweating Bullets.

Filmography

Film

Television

References

External links 
 

Canadian film actresses
Canadian television actresses
Best Actress in a Comedy Series Canadian Screen Award winners
Living people
Best Supporting Actress in a Drama Series Canadian Screen Award winners
Year of birth missing (living people)